Entomologist's Monthly Magazine is a British entomological journal, founded by a staff of five editors – T. Blackburn, H. G. Knaggs, M.D., R. McLachlan, F.L.S., E. C. Rye and H. T. Stainton – and first published in 1864. The journal publishes original papers and notes on all orders of insects and terrestrial arthropods from any part of the world, specialising in groups other than Lepidoptera.

Although its name would suggest otherwise, it is currently produced only four times per year by Pemberley Books as of 2007.

References

External links
The Entomologist's monthly magazine, Hathi Trust Digital Library (full view from vol. 1 - 14, 1864-1878)
Biodiversity Library, vol. 1 - 58 (1864-1922), Free downloads.
Pemberley Books

Entomology journals and magazines
Science and technology magazines published in the United Kingdom
Monthly magazines published in the United Kingdom
Magazines established in 1864